In machine learning and data mining, quantification (variously called learning to quantify, or supervised prevalence estimation, or class prior estimation) is the task of using supervised learning in order to train models (quantifiers) that estimate the relative frequencies (also known as prevalence values) of the classes of interest in a sample of unlabelled data items. 
For instance, in a sample of 100,000 unlabelled tweets known to express opinions about a certain political candidate, a quantifier may be used to estimate the percentage of these 100,000 tweets which belong to class `Positive' (i.e., which manifest a positive stance towards this candidate), and to do the same for classes `Neutral' and `Negative'.

Quantification may also be viewed as the task of training predictors that estimate a (discrete) probability distribution, i.e., that generate a predicted distribution that approximates the unknown true distribution of the items across the classes of interest. Quantification is different from classification, since the goal of classification is to predict the class labels of individual data items, while the goal of quantification it to predict the class prevalence values of sets of data items. Quantification is also different from regression, since in regression the training data items have real-valued labels, while in quantification the training data items have class labels.

It has been shown in multiple research works
that performing quantification by classifying all unlabelled instances and then counting the instances that have been attributed to each class (the 'classify and count' method) usually leads to suboptimal quantification accuracy. This suboptimality may be seen as a direct consequence of 'Vapnik's principle', which states:

In our case, the problem to be solved directly is quantification, while the more general intermediate problem is classification. As a result of the suboptimality of the 'classify and count' method, quantification has evolved as a task in its own right, different (in goals, methods, techniques, and evaluation measures) from classification.

Quantification tasks 

The main variants of quantification, according to the characteristics of the set of classes used, are:

 Binary quantification, corresponding to the case in which there are only  classes and each data item belongs to exactly one of them;
 Single-label multiclass quantification, corresponding to the case with  classes and each data item belongs to exactly one of them;
 Ordinal quantification, corresponding to the single-label multiclass case in which a total order is defined on the set of classes.

Most known quantification methods address the binary case or the single-label multiclass case, and only few of them address the ordinal case. 

Binary-only methods include the Mixture Model (MM) method, the HDy method, SVM(KLD), and SVM(Q).

Methods that can deal with both the binary case and the single-label multiclass case include probabilistic classify and count (PCC), adjusted classify and count (ACC), probabilistic adjusted classify and count (PACC), and the Saerens-Latinne-Decaestecker EM-based method (SLD).

Methods for the ordinal case include Ordinal Quantification Tree (OQT), and ordinal version of the above-mentioned ACC, PACC, and SLD methods.

Evaluation measures for quantification 

Several evaluation measures can be used for evaluating the error of a quantification method.
Since quantification consists of generating a predicted probability distribution that estimates a true probability distribution, these evaluation measures are ones that compare two probability distributions. Most evaluation measures for quantification belong to the class of divergences. Evaluation measures for binary quantification and single-label multiclass quantification are

 Absolute Error
 Squared Error
 Relative Absolute Error
 Kullback-Leibler divergence
 Pearson Divergence

Evaluation measures for ordinal quantification are

 Normalized Match Distance (a particular case of the Earth Mover's Distance)
 Root Normalized Order-Aware Distance

Applications 

Quantification is of special interest in fields such as the social sciences,
epidemiology,
market research, and ecological modelling,
since these fields are inherently concerned with aggregate data; however, quantification is also useful in applications outside these fields, such as in measuring classifier bias
and enforcing classifier fairness, performing word sense disambiguation,
allocating resources,
and improving the accuracy of classifiers.

Resources 

 LQ 2021: the 1st International Workshop on Learning to Quantify

 LQ 2022: the 2nd International Workshop on Learning to Quantify

 LeQua 2022: A machine learning competition on Learning to Quantify 

 QuaPy: An open-source Python-based software library for quantification

References 

Machine learning